Fachryza Abimanyu (born 15 May 1997) is an Indonesian badminton player affiliated with Jaya Raya Jakarta club.

Achievements

BWF World Junior Championships 
Mixed doubles

Asian Junior Championships 
Mixed doubles

BWF International Challenge/Series (1 title, 1 runner-up) 
Mixed doubles

  BWF International Challenge tournament
  BWF International Series tournament
  BWF Future Series tournament

Performance timeline

National team 
 Junior level

Individual competitions 
 Junior level

 Senior level

References

External links 
 

1997 births
Living people
Sportspeople from Jakarta
Indonesian male badminton players
21st-century Indonesian people